Shen Yinmo (沈尹默, 1883June 1, 1971) was a Chinese poet and calligrapher.

Early Years 
He was born in Shaanxi, Hanyang 陕西省汉阴厅 province. He made his name in Kyoto, Japan. He was one of the first to write in the new style and he published his poems in periodicals such as La Jeunesse (New Youth) and Xīncháo (新潮, The Renaissance). Two works that made him famous were Sānxián and Qiūmíng Jí.  Sānxián (1918) was one of the earliest poems written in the new vernacular style.   He also wrote poems in the classical style. In his poems, he used rhyme and alliteration similar to the usage in classical poetry. He was a professor in several universities, and later became president of Beiping University.

Photo: 1929 New Year party at Zhou Zuoren studio Shen Yinmo 2nd left, friend Zhang Fengju 1st left.

He resigned his post in 1932 due to dissatisfaction with government policies and moved to Shanghai.  From that time Shen earned his livelihood from writings and calligraphy, accepting only occasional titular positions in government.  When full-fledged Japanese invasion began, he went to Chongqing in 1939, and Chengdu in 1940 and returned again to Chongqing.

His first essay on calligraphy "Five Word Brush Technique"《执笔五字法》was published in 1943.  It clarified the respective 5 word and 4-word brush techniques.  Following the defeat of Japan, he returned to Shanghai and continued as a professional calligrapher and poet.

Shen Yinmo married his long-time companion Chǔbǎoquán 褚保权 on October 10, 1947.  They went to Hangzhou for their honeymoon.  She was also an accomplished calligrapher.

Poetry Example - Sānxián (三弦) 
This short poem evokes vivid imagery, sound and emotion.   It has no meter and no rhyme, all in vernacular.  Yet it is undoubtedly a poem.  A perfect example of the new style.

Example of Literary Entertainment 

Old friends celebrating meeting again in Shanghai, 1937. Composed poems and brush painting with toasts to produce this impromptu  handscroll.  The scroll was jointedly composed, jointly signed in several places, and all written by Shen Yinmo.  The fish painting was by Shen Wangsi.   郭沫若 沈尹默 沈迈士 张凤举 民国廿六年(1937)作 鱼酒唱和手卷.

They were friends about a dozen years ago in Beijing and Tokyo and collaborated closely on many literary journals.  Guo Moruo 郭沫若 just came back from his 2nd trip in Japan.  Guo, Shen with his constant companion Zhubaoquan, Zhang Fengju 张凤举 with his new bride and Shen Wangsi 沈迈士 enjoyed a fish and wine fest to produce this joint handscroll in the Jingjiang Hotel.   Soon Guo departed to join Mao Tse-dong  to fight the Japanese invasion on the outskirts of Shanghai.

See full text and translations here.

Another Example, a Calligraphy Fan

This is a fan with calligraphy by Shen Yinmo 沈尹默, Ma Heng 马衡 and Zhang Fengju 张凤举 :

Calligraphy fan by Shen Yinmo 沈尹默, Ma Heng and Zhang Fengju

It was likely done at a similar occasion and presented to one of the guests.

Post 1949 
Following the establishment of the People's Republic, he assumed a number of official and semi-official positions.  These included Deputy Head of the Central Culture Bureau 中央文史馆副馆长 (appointed by Chou En Lai ), Shanghai Municipal People's Council Member上海市人委委员, member of the People's Congress (national) and member of the People's Consultative Committee 全国人大代表和政协委员.  There were also numerous semi-official positions in cultural and calligraphy organizations.  He personally established the Shangahi Chinese Calligraphy and Seal Research Institute上海市中国书法篆刻研究会.

Around 1950, his poems appeared prominently in the literature supplement of the newspapers Guangming Daily, Wen Hui Bao, and Jiefang Daily.  He published many articles, poems and calligraphy during the following dozen-plus years until the Cultural Revolution in 1966.  On the occasion of the 10th anniversary for the People's Republic in 1959, he presented 115 poems.

He was elected by Shanghai to be a Representative of the National People's Congress in September 1964.

He is best known as a calligrapher. Shen Yinmo's calligraphy stylistic range and techniques span to the Song Dynasty masters. Most artists can only emulate to the Qing and few can achieve the Ming period. This is an assessment by Professor Lu 陆维钊 of the Zhejiang Academy of Arts. He was director of a research institute and published many historical studies on calligraphy drawing upon his personal mental and technical experiences when emulating famous earlier styles.

During the Cultural Revolution (1966–76) Shen, already in his 80s, was tortured by the Red Guards. They were against all non-communist forms of art and culture and declared Shen a "counter-revolutionary".  He destroyed all his personal writings and his collection of old calligraphy and manuscripts.  It was not enough.  He was forced to write confessions and self-criticisms, posting them outside his house.  These were eagerly taken by people who sought his calligraphy.

He eventually succumbed to the after effects of the repeated abuse at the age of 87.

Major Achievements. 书法大师 
Shen Yinmo was a unique and important figure in the 20th-century Chinese literary scene.  His achievements were in 4 intersecting domains.  1)  He was an accomplished poet both in classical and vernacular Chinese.   2)  He was a great calligrapher who mastered a full range of styles going all the way back to the Song Dynasty artists.  He was prolific and left a huge body of works.  3)   Shen Yinmo studied and analyzed the techniques of calligraphy brushwork publishing numerous works about brushwork.  4)  He expanded the popularity of calligraphy as an art form by his numerous exhibitions and other activities as well as by cultivating younger talent.  For example, he would publish poems in popular newspapers such as Wen Hui Bao 文汇报 in calligraphy instead of literary journal.

Shen Yinmo was a unique contributor to a vibrant 20th-century Chinese cultural scene. where he left an indelible legacy.

Publications (partial list) 
1918 - Poem Sānxián, published in La Jeunesse

1929 - Qiu Ming collected poems 2 volumes.  《秋明集》,上下二册,由北京书局出版.

1943 - Five Word Brush Technique《执笔五字法》分清了五字执笔法.  His first publication on calligraphy techniques.

1946 -  Return Home 《归来集》,  collection completed October following return to Shanghai.

1951 -  additional Qiu Ming poems《秋明室杂诗》及《秋明长短句》

1951 -  About Calligraphy《谈书法》

View of Calligraphy of 2 Wang's《二王法书管窥》;

1965  -  Experiences of Famous Historical Calligraphers《历代名家学书经验谈辑妻释义》; published  Da Gong Bao, Hong Kong

1978 -   Shu fa lun cong 书法论丛, 上海敎育出版社, Shanghai : Shanghai jiao yu chu ban she, 1978.

Shen Yimo Scripture Calligraphy《沈尹默法书集》;

Four Styles of Shen Yinmo Calligraphy《沈尹默手书词稿四种》;

Shen Yinmo Shou Style Verse Calligraphy《沈尹默入蜀词墨迹》.

References

External links
Straddling East and West: Lin Yutang, a modern literatus: the Lin Yutang family collection of Chinese painting and calligraphy, an exhibition catalog from The Metropolitan Museum of Art Libraries (fully available online as PDF), which contains material on Shen Yinmo (see table of contents)

1971 deaths
1883 births
20th-century Chinese poets
Poets from Zhejiang
Republic of China poets
People's Republic of China poets
Artists from Zhejiang
Republic of China calligraphers
People's Republic of China calligraphers
People from Huzhou
Poetry in Classical Chinese
Chinese culture
Chinese literature
Cultural Revolution
Academic staff of Peking University